Sielinko  is a village in the administrative district of Gmina Opalenica, within Nowy Tomyśl County, Greater Poland Voivodeship, in west-central Poland.

Sielinko has a Museum of Meat Production, once of the branches of the National Museum of Agriculture in Szreniawa.

References

Sielinko